The Rally for Democracy and Progress is a political party in Chad, led by Lol Mahamat Choua.

The party was founded by Choua in December 1991 and was among the first batch of political parties to be legalized in March 1992. 

In the parliamentary election held on 21 April 2002, the party, allied to the ruling Patriotic Salvation Movement, won 12 out of 155 seats.

However, since the 2005 Chad constitutional referendum, which would allow President Idriss Déby to eliminate presidential terms, the RDP has been part of the opposition.

References

Political parties in Chad